Nadamel Marth Mariam Church is a 12th-century built church in  Tripunithura, India. It belongs to the Malankara Jacobite Syriac Orthodox Church.

History
Nadamel Church was founded in the 12th Century on land donated by Valamthuruthy Bhattathiri.

Royal patronage
Nadamel church was patronised by the Cochin royal family. Whenever a new heir ascended the throne (on the 11th day after the demise of the departed monarch) he would make an offering called sharkara thattu veypu in person at the church. It was customary for the Royal Highnesses of Cochin to meet the bishops and leaders of the Syrian Christian community at the church building to the south of this church.

External links
 St Mary's Nadamel Church
 Nadamel Church

Syriac Orthodox churches in India
Churches in Kochi
12th-century churches in India
12th-century establishments in India
12th-century Oriental Orthodox church buildings